Bungarus ceylonicus, the Ceylon krait or Sri Lankan krait,  is a species of venomous elapid snake which is endemic to the island Sri Lanka, locally known as .

Description
The Sri Lankan krait is small and slender.
Its black skin is crossed with thin white transverse bands. It has an extraordinarily long lung which it inflates when angry.

Distribution and habitat
Endemic to Sri Lanka, it is fairly common to the central hilly areas of the island. It is frequently recorded from Kandy, Uva Province hilly areas, Peradeniya, Gelioya, Gampola, Nawalapitiya, Ritigala and Balangoda, but rarely recorded in low land areas.

It prefers leaf litter in forests but often ventures into human dwellings, making itself at home in old masonry and crevices.

Behaviour
The Sri Lankan krait is nocturnal and timid. It is very slow and sluggish by day. At night it may strike after considerable provocation, but behaves quite the contrary by day, often allowing itself to be handled or even bullied with impunity. During such rough treatment it usually does nothing but puff up its lung to display its discomfort.

Reproduction

Few details are recorded. The Sri Lankan krait is oviparous. It appears that either many females share a common nest, or a single female lays its eggs in several batches, making determination of clutch size difficult. The eggs are cylindrical with rounded ends and measure .

Diet
It feeds mainly on small reptiles, on frogs, and on small mammals like Rats. The fatal dose of venom is injected into the body of prey before beginning to consume it.

Venom
The highly potent venom of this snake attacks the central nervous system and gradually destroys it. Death is caused when the respiratory system is suppressed. Therefore, a bite from this snake should be treated immediately, or else the victim may die within 12 hours.

References

ceylonicus
Reptiles of Sri Lanka
Endemic fauna of Sri Lanka
Reptiles described in 1858
Taxa named by Albert Günther